is a railway station in Nobeoka, Miyazaki, Japan.

Lines

Layout 
The station consists of a side and an island platform serving three tracks at grade set within a largely industrial area. The station building is a modern two storey structure which is integrated with a footbridge. A staffed ticket window and waiting area are located on the second level. After the ticket gate, a short flight of steps leads up to the footbridge which gives access to the side and island platform. Multiple sidings, mostly for freight trains, are located east and west of the platforms. On the west side, among the sidings, a private leased line branches off towards the industrial plant of the Asahi Kasei chemical corporation.

Management of the passenger facilities at the station has been outsourced to the JR Kyushu Tetsudou Eigyou Co., a wholly owned subsidiary of JR Kyushu specialising in station services. It staffs the ticket window which is equipped with a Midori no Madoguchi facility.

Adjacent stations

History
In 1913, the  had opened a line from  northwards to Hirose (now closed). After the Miyazaki Prefectural Railway was nationalized on 21 September 1917, Japanese Government Railways (JGR) undertook the subsequent extension of the track as part of the then Miyazaki Main Line, reaching Tomitaka (now ) by 11 October 1921. In the next phase of expansion, the track was extended to Minami-Nobeoka, which opened as the new northern terminus on 11 February 1922. Expanding north in phases and joining up with other networks, the track eventually reached  and the entire stretch from Kokura through this station to Miyakonojō was redesignated as the Nippō Main Line on 15 December 1923. With the privatization of Japanese National Railways (JNR), the successor of JGR, on 1 April 1987, the station came under the control of JR Kyushu.

Passenger statistics
In fiscal 2016, the station was used by an average of 837 passengers daily (boarding passengers only), and it ranked 187th among the busiest stations of JR Kyushu.

See also
List of railway stations in Japan

References

External links 

Minami-Nobeoka (JR Kyushu)

Railway stations in Miyazaki Prefecture
Railway stations in Japan opened in 1922
Nobeoka, Miyazaki